The North American Indigenous Games is a multi-sport event involving indigenous North American athletes staged intermittently since 1990. The Games are governed by the North American Indigenous Games Council, a 26-member council of representatives from 13 provinces and territories in Canada and 13 regions in the United States.

History
The dream to hold a games for the indigenous peoples of North America began in the 1970s.

In 1971, the Native Summer Games held in Enoch, Alberta, Canada drew 3,000 participants competing in 13 sports and many cultural events.

In 1973, the Western Canada Native Winter Games were held on the Blood Reserve in Kainai, Alberta, Canada.

In 1975, a meeting of the National Indian Athletic Association was held in Reno, Nevada, where it was decided to organize games for indigenous peoples. John Fletcher, a Peigan from Edmonton, Alberta, Canada, and Willie Littlechild, a Cree of the Ermineskin Tribe at Hobbema, Alberta, Canada, attended; John Fletcher is credited for his support in the decision to have the games, as presented by Mr. Littlechild, based on the above success.

In 1977, the dream to host large-scale indigenous games took another step forward in Sweden at the Annual Assembly of the World Council of Indigenous Peoples. Willie Littlechild presented the motion to host international indigenous games. It was unanimously passed. A Brazilian elder was so moved, he presented Willie Littlechild with a war arrow representing peace in his tribe. Advising it be pointed to the ground, this arrow would direct anything evil toward the underground. It is now part of the sacred ceremonial run.

The vision: to improve the quality of life for indigenous peoples by supporting self-determined sports and cultural activities which encourage equal access to participation in the social / cultural / spiritual fabric of the community in which they reside and which respects Indigenous distinctiveness.

"The vision of the NAIG, from the very beginning, along with my brothers, Willie Littlechild of Ermineskin First Nation at Hobbema, and Big John Fletcher of Peigan in Southern Alberta, was one of our interest and concern about what was happening among the young people in all of our communities. . . We took it upon ourselves to try and find something constructive for the young people to look forward to. And, what it was eventually, was that we would put together a plan for a Games through which the young Aboriginal people could come together to excel in their athletic field of endeavour and to come together to do other things: to make new friendships, to renew old ones, and so on..." (Charles Wood, 1990 Chairperson)

The dream became a reality in 1990.

The first North American Indigenous Games (or "NAIG") were held in 1990 in Edmonton, Alberta, followed by Prince Albert, Saskatchewan, in 1993, Blaine, Minnesota, in 1995, Victoria, British Columbia, in 1997, Winnipeg, Manitoba, in 2002, Denver, Colorado, in 2006 and Cowichan, British Columbia, in 2008. The 2011 games were to be held in Milwaukee, Wisconsin, but about a year before the games were to be held, Milwaukee withdrew its host application due to the lack of financial backers. Other arrangements, however, were made and games were indeed held in Milwaukee, in July 2011 on a smaller scale (dubbed United States Indigenous Games). The 2014 games took place in Regina, Saskatchewan followed by the 2017 games in Toronto, Ontario.

Approximately 10,000 athletes from the United States and Canada took part in the 2006 games (the largest to date), with more than 1,000 tribes represented. In addition to sporting events, the games included a parade and a variety of cultural performances. The opening ceremonies were held at Invesco Field at Mile High and the closing ceremonies were held at Skyline Park.

Approximately 5,000 athletes from the United States and Canada took part in the 2014 games, in Regina, Saskatchewan, Canada,  (July 20–27, 2014) with more than 756 tribes represented. In addition to sporting events, the games included a large cultural village at The First Nations University of Canada and a variety of cultural performances throughout the host city. The opening ceremonies were held at Mosaic Stadium at Taylor Field and the closing ceremonies were held at The First Nations University of Canada campus. Of note was a large and violent storm that went through the cultural village on July 24, nearly destroying everything except for the tipis; an army of over 300 volunteers worked through the night to clean it up in time for the following days activities.

Editions

Sports
Gold, silver, and bronze medals were awarded in sixteen sports:

Archery
Badminton
Basketball
Baseball
Boxing
Canoeing
Golf
Lacrosse
Rifle shooting
Soccer
Softball
Swimming
Tae Kwon Do
Track and field and cross-country running
Volleyball
Wrestling

Total medals

Culture
The North American Indigenous Games Council, host societies and other partners realize the potential of a strong cultural program that would not only be for the benefit of the participants but also to the wider host community.

A cultural program at any NAIG shall be consistent with the founding principles:

To promote indigenous cultural activities and exhibitions
To promote local indigenous history and culture
To ensure traditional ceremonies that are utilized by the Host Territory are provided for NAIG participants
To ensure that traditional foods are for sale throughout the village
To ensure that indigenous people are showcased to sell, demonstrate and promote their crafts and artwork.
To ensure that indigenous people showcase knowledge and information pertaining to aboriginal youth programs.
To ensure that an Elders Program is designed to promote cultural and historical sharing through storytelling, ceremonies and interchange
To showcase a cultural gala of performers from all participating units at the opening of the Cultural Village
The cultural program shall be generally available and appealing to the general public in the host community and jurisdiction and all participants and visitors of the NAIG

Bidding

The NAIG initially were to be hosted every three years alternating between Canada and the United States of America, although more recently the Games have just been held in Canadian locations. The NAIG can be bid on by interested ‘host candidate cities’ through a comprehensive and lengthy bid process. The NAIG Council Bid Committee is responsible for updating, initiating, monitoring and evaluating the bid procedures.

Notes

References

See also
 World Indigenous Games
 Indigenous Peoples' Games

External links
North American Indigenous Games Council Official Website
North American Indigenous Games 2014 Official Website
North American Indigenous Games 2017 Official Website
Staff writers. "2006 Indigenous Games wrap up in Denver," Indian Country Today, 2006-07-14. Retrieved on 2006-07-28.

Indigenous peoples of North America
Multi-sport events in North America
Sports festivals in North America
Native American festivals
Indigenous sports and games of the Americas
First Nations sportspeople
Recurring sporting events established in 1990